Tinea sequens is a moth of the family Tineidae first described by Edward Meyrick in 1919. It is known from Guyana.

This species has a wingspan of 7-8  m. The forewings are white, with a few blackish specks and two subconfluent blackish-grey spots on the costa towards the base. There is a blackish-grey spot on the costa at two-fifths, where an oblique irregular more or less developed streak runs to the anterior end of a black dash in the disc beyond the middle. Another black dash is found between this and the termen, accompanied by a few dark grey scales and there is a blackish-grey spot on the costa at three-fourths, as well as an apical spot of blackish-grey sprinkles. The hindwings are light grey.

References

Tineinae
Moths described in 1919
Moths of South America